Raymond Mantilla (June 22, 1934 – March 21, 2020) was an American percussionist.

Discography

As leader
 Mantilla (Inner City, 1978)
 Hands of Fire (Red, 1984)
 Synergy (Red, 1986)
 Dark Powers (Red, 1988)
 The Next Step (Red, 2000)
 Man-Ti-Ya (Savant, 2004)
 Good Vibrations (Savant, 2006)
 The Connection (Savant, 2013)
 High Voltage (Savant, 2017)
 Rebirth (Savant, 2021)

As sideman
With Mose Allison
 1994 The Earth Wants You
 1997 Jazz Profile

With Gato Barbieri
Chapter Three: Viva Emiliano Zapata (Impulse!, 1974)
Yesterdays (Flying Dutchman, 1974)

With Ray Barretto
 1961 Barretto Para Bailar
 1963 Latino! & Afro-Jaws
 1973 Carnaval: Latino!/Pachanga with Barretto

With Joe Beck
Beck & Sandborn (Columbia, 1975)
Beck (Kudu, 1975)

With Walter Bishop Jr.
Cubicle (Muse, 1978)
With Art Blakey
Child's Dance (Prestige, 1972)
In My Prime Vol. 1 (Timeless, 1977)
In My Prime Vol. 2 (Timeless, 1977)

With Teresa Brewer
 1982 Midnight Cafe (A Few More for the Road)
 1984 Live at Carnegie Hall & Montreaux, Switzerland
 1983 I Dig Big Band Singers

With Kenny Burrell
 1991 Sunup to Sundown
 1998 Kenny Burrell and the Jazz Giants

With Joe Chambers
The Almoravid (Muse, 1973)
New World (Finite, 1976)

With Richie Cole
 New York Afternoon (Muse, 1977)
 1977 Alto Madness
 1986 Pure Imagination
 1996 West Side Story
 1998 Richie & Phil & Richie
 2006 Rises's Rose Garden

With Larry Coryell
 1975 Basics (1968–1969)
 1979 Return
 2002 Birdfingers

With Joe Farrell
Canned Funk (CTI, 1975)

With John Hicks
Sweet Love of Mine (HighNote, 2006)

With Morgana King
 1998 Looking Through the Eyes of Love 
 2000 Tender Moments

With Herbie Mann
Flute, Brass, Vibes and Percussion (Verve, 1959)
The Common Ground (Atlantic, 1961)
The Family of Mann (Atlantic, 1961)
Herbie Mann at the Village Gate (Atlantic, 1962)
Herbie Mann Returns to the Village Gate (Atlantic, 1963)
Our Mann Flute (Atlantic, 1966)
Discothèque (Atlantic, 1975)
Waterbed (Atlantic, 1975)

With M'Boom
Collage (Soul Note, 1984)
To the Max! (Enja, 1990–91)
 Live at S.O.B.'s New York (1992)

With Jack McDuff
Magnetic Feel (Cadet, 1975)
With Jimmy McGriff
The Groover (JAM, 1982)
With Bob McHugh
 1994 Manhattan Sunrise 
 2003 Another Sunrise

With Charles Mingus
 1978 Cumbia & Jazz Fusion
 1979 Me, Myself an Eye
 1981 Something Like a Bird

With Diedre Murray and Fred Hopkins
 Stringology (Black Saint, 1994)

With James Spaulding
Gotstabe a Better Way! (Muse, 1988 [1990])

With Jeremy Steig
Monium (Columbia, 1974)
Temple of Birth (Columbia, 1975)
Firefly (CTI, 1977)

With The Players Association
 1980 We Got the Groove
 1998 The Players Association/Turn the Music Up!

With Mickey Tucker
Mister Mysterious (Muse, 1978)

With Cedar Walton
Mobius (RCA, 1975)
The Pentagon (East Wind, 1976)
Soundscapes (Columbia, 1980)
 Roots (1997)
Latin Tinge (HighNote, 2002)
The Bouncer (HighNote, 2011)

References

External links
 

1934 births
2020 deaths
American jazz drummers
Musicians from New York City
20th-century American drummers
American male drummers
Jazz musicians from New York (state)
20th-century American male musicians
American male jazz musicians
M'Boom members